Cactus Flat is one of the Central Nevada Desert Basins in the Cactus-Sacrobatus Watershed, for which it is an eponym.  The flat is the location of the Tonopah Test Range Airport and Tonopah Test Range, a component of the Nevada Test and Training Range used for weapons testing since the 1950s.  The flat is also the site of the  Nevada Wild Horse Range of the Nellis Air Force Range.

The Kawich Range lies to the northeast and the Cactus Range to the southwest.

Cactus Flat has three cactus types (Beavertail cactus, Calico cactus and Barrel cactus).

References

External links
 

Central Basin and Range ecoregion
Basins of Nevada
Landforms of Nye County, Nevada